Rigoli is a village in Tuscany, central Italy, administratively a frazione of the comune of San Giuliano Terme, province of Pisa.

Rigoli is about 9 km from Pisa and 3 km from San Giuliano Terme.

References

Bibliography 
 

Frazioni of the Province of Pisa